The Ardwick Industrial Park Shuttle Line, designated Route F12, is a weekday-only bus route operated by the Washington Metropolitan Area Transit Authority between the New Carrollton station and Cheverly station on the Orange Line of the Washington Metro. The line operates every 35–37 minutes during peak hours and 60 minutes all other times, weekdays only. F12 trips are roughly 30 minutes.

Background
Route F12 operates weekdays only between New Carrollton station and Cheverly station from 5:40 am to 7:23 pm operating 35–37 minutes during peak hours and 60 minutes all other times. Route F12 gets its buses out of Landover Division. Prior to 1989, route F12 would get its buses out of Southern Avenue division.

History
Route F12 was created as a brand new Metrobus Route by WMATA on December 3, 1978, when New Carrollton & Landover stations opened. Route F12 was designed to operate between New Carrollton & Landover stations, via Ardwick Industrial Park on Weekdays only via Garden City Drive, Pennsy Drive, Ardwick-Ardmore Road, Jefferson Avenue, Polk Street, and Pennsy Drive. When operating to New Carrollton, it would make a right turn from the intersection of Ardwick-Ardmore Road onto the intersection of Pennsy Drive because Ardwick-Ardmore Road is only a one-way street between the intersections of Garden City Drive & Pennsy Drive and will operate along Corporate Drive and Garden City Drive to serve New Carrollton. Route F12 will also serve an extra loop serving Metro East Office Park after serving New Carrollton.

On December 11, 1993, route F12 was extended from Landover station, to operate up to Cheverly station, in order to replace the segment of the former route F3 routing between Cheverly station & Columbia Park subdivision of Landover when route F3 was discontinued. Route F12 would keep operating its same routing between New Carrollton & Landover stations but would operate between Landover & Cheverly stations, via Pennsy Drive, Old Landover Road, Landover Road, Martin Luther King Jr. Highway, Columbia Park Road, East Marlboro Avenue, Flagstaff Street, Kent Village Drive, and Columbia Park Road.

Proposed Elimination
In February 2020, WMATA proposed to discontinue route F12 as part of fiscal year 2021 budget due to low ridership. However WMATA later backed out the elimination.

References

F12
Washington Metro